Ella may refer to:

 Ella (name), most often a feminine given name, but also used as a surname

Places

United States
 Ella, Kentucky, an unincorporated community
 Ella, Oregon, an unincorporated community
 Ella, Pennsylvania, an unincorporated community
 Ella, Wisconsin, an unincorporated community
 Lake Ella, Tallahassee, Florida

Greenland
 Ella Island, an uninhabited island of the Greenland Sea, Greenland

Sri Lanka
 Ella, Sri Lanka, a town in Uva Province, Sri Lanka

Arts and entertainment

Music
 Ella (Ella Fitzgerald album), 1969
 Ella (Juan Gabriel album), 1980
 Ella (Malaysian singer) (born 1966)
 "Ella" (Jack de Nijs song), by André Moss, Jack De Nijs, 1973
 "Ella", song by Raphael (singer) L. Favio, 1969
 "Ella" (José Alfredo Jiménez song)
 "Ella", song by The Way (band) J. Hill, R. Hill, 1972
 "Ella", song by Bebe from Pafuera Telarañas, 2004
 , by Argentine group Tan Biónica, 2010

Other
Ella (2016), documentary film about Australian dancer Ella Havelka
 Ella Martinez, a protagonist in the Maximum Ride fantasy novel series
 Ella (novel), by Uri Geller
 the title character of Ella the Elephant, a Canadian animated preschool series

Other uses
 ELLA (programming language), hardware design language
 435 Ella, a Main belt asteroid
 Tropical Storm Ella (disambiguation), several tropical storms 
 , various United States Navy ships
 Ella, trade name in the US of ulipristal acetate, an emergency contraceptive

See also
 
 "Ella, elle l'a", a 1987 song by France Gall
 Several settlements near Kingston upon Hull, Yorkshire, England, United Kingdom:
 East Ella
 Kirk Ella
 West Ella
 Elah (disambiguation)
 Aelle (disambiguation)